Semperit AG Holding is a manufacturer of industrial polymer and plastic products based in Vienna, Austria. From the middle 20th century, it produced bicycle tires for the Austrian road bicycle sold by Sears & Roebuck, including the classic white wall tires. Semperit is listed on the Vienna Stock Exchange, 50% of the company is owned by B&C Holding, with the rest being free float.

History 
1824	Johann Nepomuk Reithoffer receives the patent for waterproof fabrics

1949	Semperit begins manufacturing System Hans Hass swim fins designed by Hans Hass

References

External links

Vienna Stock Exchange: Market Data Semperit AG

Manufacturing companies based in Vienna
Manufacturing companies established in 1824
Tire manufacturers of Austria
Austrian brands
Diving equipment manufacturers